Burundi Workers' Party (PTB; , UBU) was a clandestine communist party in Burundi. Its primary constituency was the large Burundian refugee population situated in neighboring Rwanda.

The party was founded in December 1979 by Salvator Buyagu, Cyprien Ntaryamira, Melchior Ndadaye, Jérôme Ndiho, Festus Ntanyungu, Jean Ndikumana, Sylvestre Ntibantunganya, and several others.

When UBU was disbanded, followers of Ndadaye regrouped into the Front for Democracy in Burundi (FRODÉBU).

References

Sources
Eggers, Ellen K. Historical dictionary of Burundi. 2nd ed. Lanham: Scarecrow Press, 1997.

Defunct political parties in Burundi
Communism in Burundi
Communist parties in Africa
Political parties established in 1979
1979 establishments in Burundi
Political parties with year of disestablishment missing